The 1956 United States presidential election in Alabama took place on November 6, 1956, as part of the 1956 United States presidential election. Alabama voters chose eleven representatives, or electors, to the Electoral College, who voted for president and vice president. In Alabama, voters voted for electors individually instead of as a slate, as in the other states.

Alabama was won by Adlai Stevenson (D–Illinois), running with Senator Estes Kefauver, with 56.52 percent of the popular vote against incumbent President Dwight D. Eisenhower (R–Pennsylvania), running with Vice President Richard Nixon, with 39.39% of the popular vote. Stevenson received ten of Alabama's eleven electoral votes; the eleventh was cast by a faithless elector for Walter B. Jones.

, this is the last election in which Macon County voted for a Republican nominee, and the only election since Reconstruction that this majority-black county has voted Republican. It is also the last time that Houston County voted for a Democratic nominee, and the last time that the state has supported a losing Democrat for president.

Results

Results by county

See also
United States presidential elections in Alabama

Notes

References

Alabama
1956
1956 Alabama elections